Johan Jacob Döbelius (29 March 1674, Rostock, Germany – 14 January 1743, Lund, Sweden), was a professor of medicine.

Life
After studies in Leiden, Döbelius became a Doctor of Medicine.

He ended up in Gothenburg, where he practiced medicine for a while.

He was appointed to the provincial physician of Bohuslän in 1697 and later on, in 1699 as the provincial physician of Skåne.

Döbelius was appointed to physician to the military in Scania. In 1710 he was appointed to be professor of medicine at the University of Lund. He was the headmaster of the university in the years 1717, 1729 and 1742.

He was the great-grandfather of Swedish military commander Georg Carl von Döbeln.

Ramlösa
He discovered Ramlösa hälsobrunn, a source of mineral water near Helsingborg, Sweden that was open to the public in 1707. According to Döbelius, there were thousands of people at the opening and the water from the well could treat dizziness, trembling of joints, gout, headache, bad breath and even hysteria, among other things.

References

External links
Bibliotheca Döbeliana About Döbelius and his book collection at Lund University Library

1674 births
1743 deaths
17th-century German physicians
18th-century German physicians
Academic staff of Lund University
17th-century German writers
17th-century German male writers
18th-century German writers
18th-century German male writers
18th century in Skåne County

John Jacob